Applause is an expression of approval by the act of clapping.

Applause may also refer to:

Film
 Applause (1929 film), an American musical
 Applause (1944 film), a Greek drama
 Applause (2009 film), a Danish drama

Enterprises
 Applause (toy company), a toy company founded in 1966

Music
 Applause Records, a short-lived record label founded in 1981
 Applause, a guitar manufactured by the Ovation Guitar Company

 Applause (musical), a 1970 musical based on the 1950 film All About Eve
 "Applause" (Bonnie Franklin song), the musical's title track
 "Applause" (Lady Gaga song), 2013
 "Applause", a song by Janis Ian from her 1974 album Stars
 "Applause", a song written by Diane Warren from the 2022 film Tell It Like a Woman

Publishing
 Applause Books, an imprint of the Hal Leonard Corporation
 Applause Magazine, a publication of the Denver Center for the Performing Arts
 Applause Magazine, a publication for Mary Kay Cosmetics sellers
 Applause Magazine, an online Australian fashion magazine

Other uses
 Daihatsu Applause, a compact car first manufactured in 1989